Lyons Township High School (often referred to as LTHS or simply LT) is a public high school located in Western Springs, Illinois (South Campus), and also in La Grange, Illinois (North Campus). 

Lyons Township is a co-educational high school and serves grades 9–12 for Lyons Township High School District 204. Students from the communities of La Grange, Western Springs, Burr Ridge, La Grange Park, Countryside, Indian Head Park, Hodgkins, and parts of Brookfield, Willow Springs, and McCook attend Lyons Township. Lyons Township High School is the 8th-largest public high school in Illinois and the 46th-largest public high school in the United States. Freshmen and Sophomores attend class at South campus, located at 4900 S. Willow Springs Rd. in Western Springs, while Juniors and Seniors attend class at North campus, located at 100 S. Brainard Ave. in La Grange, which also houses the district offices. Sports facilities at Lyons Township include swimming pools, field houses, theatres, a turf football field (south campus), soccer fields, baseball fields, a gym, outdoor tracks, basketball courts, and volleyball courts. The two campuses are about a mile apart. Activity buses run after school between the campuses, along with buses that run at the end of 1st period and beginning of 8th period to commute Freshman & Sophomores from North Campus to South Campus and to commute Juniors & Seniors from South Campus to North Campus.

History

Lyons Township High School was opened on September 4, 1888. The enrollment included 39 students. An athletic field named Emmond Field was constructed in 1888, and a 1926–1929 expansion included the erection of a clock tower, auditorium, offices, library, and a gym. Leonard H. Vaughan (president of a seed company and former school board president,) funded the erection of the Vaughan Building; it was constructed in 1949 for sporting events and classes. In 1956, South Campus was opened about a mile south-west in nearby Western Springs to accommodate the community's growing population. The Corral was constructed in 1944 as a social place for all students to spend time with each other after school hours. In 2005, a performing arts center, a field house, and a pool were added to the South campus to complement the facilities at the North campus.

Athletics

At LTHS, boys compete in baseball, basketball, bowling, cross country, football, golf, gymnastics, lacrosse, soccer, swimming & diving, tennis, track & field, volleyball, and water polo. The Lyons Township Hockey Club is associated with the Township of Lyons, not LTHS. Girls compete in badminton, basketball, bowling, cross country, golf, gymnastics, soccer, softball, swimming & diving, tennis, track & field, volleyball, and water polo. Other sports that are present at LT and not limited to any one gender are Competitive Cheer, Competitive Dance, Special Olympics Basketball, and Special Olympics Track. There are also some non-athletic clubs that are still affiliated with IHSA (e.g. Speech, Debate, Scholastic Bowl, Chess, etc).

The following teams have won their respective IHSA state championship tournaments:
 Baseball: 1967, 2003, 2011
 Baseball (Summer): 2002, 2004, 2006, 2012
 Basketball (boys): 1953, 1970
 Basketball (Special Olympics): 1995, 2005
 Cross country (boys): 1951, 1955, 1956
 Golf (boys): 1938, 1939
 Gymnastics (boys): 2021
 Gymnastics (girls): 2013, 2014
 Soccer (boys): 2009
 Swimming and diving (boys): 2016, 2017
 Tennis (girls): 1990, 1991, 1992
 Track and field (boys): 1914, 1915, 1948, 1949, 1952, 1953, 1954, 1961, 1971
 Volleyball (girls): 1976, 1989, 2010
 Water Polo (boys): 2012, 2015
 Water Polo (girls): 2010
 Speech: 1953

Newspaper
The LION newspaper is the student publication of LTHS. The LION is a member of the High School National Ad Network. The newspaper has won multiple awards:
 Journalism Education Association and National Scholastic Press Association: 1st place nationally in 16+ page category in 1999
 Scholastic Press Association: 1st place (national overall newspaper award)
 Northern Illinois School Press Association: Golden Eagle Award: Best of Class 2009, One Honor Scholarship, 13 individual Blue
 The red stripe award for journalistic excellence ribbons, and 47 Honorable Mentions
 National Scholastic Press Association and Journalism Education Association: Two individual Awards of Excellence and one Honorable Mention
 American Society of Newspaper Editors and Quill & Scroll: Four national 1st place awards
 Illinois Men’s Press Association: A 2nd place award in Column Writing and an Honorable Mention in Sports Writing

WLTL
LTHS is the license holder of WLTL-FM, a Class A non-commercial radio station which broadcasts from North Campus on 88.1 FM. WLTL has won several national and local awards, including the Service to Young Children award. The station is student-run, with new student managers selected each year.

WLTL is the recipient of more than 25 awards of excellence, including the John Dunn award for "Best High School Radio Station in the Nation" and has had 10 consecutive years winning the Communicator Award. WLTL has also been recognized nationally for the quality broadcasting that it provides by the National Association of Broadcasters. Several current media figures got their start at WLTL, including Mike Murphy of WSCR, Dave Juday of WMVP-AM, Ryan Arnold and Emma McElherne of WXRT-FM, and Phil LeBeau of CNBC.

Notable alumni

 Jeff Adams, football player
 George Burditt, lawyer and politician
Bruce “Soupy” Campbell, baseball player
 Terrel E. Clarke, Illinois state legislator and businessman
 Jack Collom, Poet and teacher; pioneered the modern Eco-Lit poetry genre
 Joel Cummins, keyboardist of Umphrey's McGee
 Jimmy Dunne (songwriter), songwriter, TV and film composer
 Jake Elliott, NFL kicker for Philadelphia Eagles; made longest field goal by a rookie in NFL history on September 24, 2017(61 yards).
 Nick Fuentes, a white nationalist, far-right political commentator and podcaster
 Kathy Gleason, Professor of Landscape Architecture at Cornell University
 David Hasselhoff, actor and singer, best known for television series Knight Rider, Baywatch, and America's Got Talent
 John Hattendorf, professor and historian specializing in maritime and naval history
 Michael Hitchcock, actor, writer, and producer
 Jim Holvay, songwriter and musician
 Jeff Hornacek, professional basketball player, former head coach of New York Knicks
 Oren Koules, producer of Saw movie series, producer of Two and a Half Men TV series, former owner Tampa Bay Lightning NHL team
 Ben LaBolt, White House Communications Director
 Ben R. Mottelson, nuclear physicist who shared 1975 Nobel Prize in Physics with James Rainwater and Aage Bohr for their model of nuclear structure
 Christine Radogno, Republican leader in Illinois State Senate, representing the 41st Senate District
 Matt Rehwoldt, professional wrestler who performs as "Aiden English"
 Lou Saban, former professional football player and coach
 Frederick Upton helped organize Upton Machine Company, forerunner to Whirlpool Corporation.
 Gabrielle Walsh, actress
 Dave Wehrmeister, former MLB player (San Diego Padres, New York Yankees, Philadelphia Phillies, Chicago White Sox)
 Leona Woods, physicist who helped build Chicago Pile-1, the first nuclear reactor
 Ty Warner, CEO of Ty Inc. and inventor of Beanie Babies
 Xenia Zarina, dancer (born June Zimmerman)

References

External links
 
 LTHS Alumni Forum Alumni Forum

Educational institutions established in 1888
Public high schools in Cook County, Illinois
La Grange, Illinois
1888 establishments in Illinois
Brookfield, Illinois
School districts in Cook County, Illinois